Todor Stoev (born on 11 August 1988) is a Bulgarian footballer who currently plays as a defender for FC Chernomorets 1919 Burgas.

Career

Youth career
Stoev growth in Levski Sofia's Youth academy. He also has matches for the first team.

Belasitsa Petrich
Stoev was loaned between 27 January 2009 and June 2009. He played for Belasitsa Petrich until the end of 2008-09 season. After the end of the 08-09 season, he returned to Levski, but he was expected to be loaned again.

FC Chavdar Etropole
On 24 July 2009, Stoev was sold to FC Chavdar Etropole.

References

Bulgarian footballers
1988 births
Living people
PFC Levski Sofia players
PFC Vidima-Rakovski Sevlievo players
PFC Belasitsa Petrich players
FC Chavdar Etropole players
Neftochimic Burgas players
FC Lokomotiv Gorna Oryahovitsa players
First Professional Football League (Bulgaria) players
Association football defenders